The Harvard Crimson represented Harvard University in ECAC women's ice hockey during the 2014–15 NCAA Division I women's ice hockey season. The Crimson played in the NCAA Division I National Championship, losing to Minnesota.

Offseason
August 8: Crimson players Miye D'Oench and Michelle Picard, plus freshman Lexie Laing earned invitations to the USA Hockey Women’s National Festival at Lake Placid, New York.

Recruiting

News and notes
October 31: In her NCAA debut, Lexie Laing logged her first career goal for Harvard. Said goal was logged on the power play and would prove to be the game winning tally in a 4-1 triumph over RPI. Of note, the Crimson goaltender was Lexie's sister Brianna.

Roster

Schedule

|-
!colspan=12 style="  style="background:#af1e2d; color:#fff;"| Regular Season

|-
!colspan=12 style="  style="background:#af1e2d; color:#fff;"| ECAC Tournament

|-
!colspan=12 style="  style="background:#af1e2d; color:#fff;"| NCAA Tournament

Awards and honors
Emerance Maschmeyer, Patty Kazmaier Award nominee
 Sarah Edney, 2015 CCM Hockey Women's Division I All-Americans, Second Team
Sarah Edney, ECAC Defenseman of the Year Award 
Sarah Edney, First Team All-ECAC 
Lexie Laing, ECAC All-Rookie Team honoree
Lexie Laing, ECAC Rookie of the Year Finalist
Mary Parker, Second Team All-ECAC 
Emerance Maschmeyer, Third Team All-ECAC 
Emerance Maschmeyer, ECAC Goaltender of the Year Finalist
Emerance Maschmeyer, ECAC All-Tournament Team
Mary Parker, All-Ivy League First Team
Emerance Maschmeyer, All-Ivy League First Team
Mary Parker, ECAC Forward of the Year Finalist
Mary Parker, ECAC All-Tournament Team

References

Harvard
Harvard Crimson women's ice hockey seasons
NCAA women's ice hockey Frozen Four seasons
Harvard Crimson women's ice hockey
Harvard Crimson women's ice hockey
Harvard Crimson women's ice hockey
Harvard Crimson women's ice hockey